Giorgia Marchetti (born 21 January 1995) is an Italian tennis player.

She has career-high WTA rankings of 535 in singles, achieved on 24 July 2017, and 143 in doubles, set on 27 May 2019.

Marchetti made her WTA Tour main-draw debut at the 2019 Ladies Open Lugano in the doubles tournament, partnering Arantxa Rus.

ITF Circuit finals

Singles: 2 (1 title, 1 runner-up)

References

External links
 
 

1995 births
Living people
Italian female tennis players
21st-century Italian women
Female tennis players playing padel